Kheyrabad (also Romanized as Kheyrābād; also known as Kheyrābād-e Ḩūmeh) is a village in Kushk-e Qazi Rural District, in the Central District of Fasa County, Fars Province, Iran. At the 2006 census, its population was 1,530, in 368 families.

References 

Populated places in Fasa County